Juanchaco Airport  is an airport serving the Pacific coast village of Juanchaco in the Valle del Cauca Department of Colombia.

The airport is at the end of a peninsula above Málaga Bay, and south approaches and departures are over the water.

See also

Transport in Colombia
List of airports in Colombia

References

External links
OpenStreetMap - Juanchaco
Google Maps - Juanchaco

Airports in Colombia